The Gaunt Rocks are a small group of rocks lying  west of the Barros Rocks, in the Wilhelm Archipelago. They were roughly charted by the British Graham Land Expedition under John Rymill, 1934–37, and more accurately positioned by the Falkland Islands Dependencies Survey from photos taken by Hunting Aerosurveys Ltd in 1956–57. The name, given by the UK Antarctic Place-Names Committee in 1959, is descriptive of these desolate, grim-looking rocks.

References

Rock formations of the Wilhelm Archipelago